The 2014 Tampere Open was a professional tennis tournament played on clay courts. It was the 33rd edition of the tournament which was part of the 2014 ATP Challenger Tour and the 2014 ITF Women's Circuit. It took place in Tampere, Finland, on 21–27 July 2014.

Men's singles main draw entrants

Seeds 

 1 Rankings as of 14 July 2014

Other entrants 
The following players received wildcards into the singles main draw:
  Timi Kivijärvi
  Micke Kontinen
  Herkko Pöllänen
  Henrik Sillanpää

The following players received entry from the qualifying draw:
  Isak Arvidsson
  Harri Heliövaara
  Laurent Lokoli
  Elias Ymer

The following player entered using a protected ranking:
  Giovanni Lapentti

Women's singles main draw entrants

Seeds 

 1 Rankings as of 14 July 2014

Other entrants 
The following players received wildcards into the singles main draw:
  Nanette Nylund
  Milka-Emilia Pasanen
  Tanja Tuomi

The following players received entry from the qualifying draw:
  Karen Barbat
  Anna Iakovleva
  Anastasia Kulikova
  Mariella Minetti
  Kristina Parviainen
  Andrea Raaholt
  Luīze Līva Strīķe
  Valeriya Urzhumova

Champions

Men's singles 

  David Goffin def.  Jarkko Nieminen 7–6(7–3), 6–3

Women's singles 

  Maria Sakkari def.  Anastasia Pivovarova 6–4, 7–5

Men's doubles 

  Ruben Gonzales /  Sean Thornley def.  Elias Ymer /  Anton Zaitcev 6–7(5–7), 7–6(12–10), [10–8]

Women's doubles 

  Alexandra Nancarrow /  Maria Sakkari def.  Emma Laine /  Anastasia Pivovarova 6–2, 6–3

External links 
 Official website 

2014
2014 ATP Challenger Tour
2014 ITF Women's Circuit
Tennis tournaments in Finland
2014 in Finnish sport